Penare is a hamlet near Gorran Haven in Cornwall, England, UK.

Pronunciation is PEA - NAR.

Penare lies within the Cornwall Area of Outstanding Natural Beauty (AONB).

References

Hamlets in Cornwall